Krešimir Krnjević (7 September 1927 – 16 April 2021) was a Canadian-British neurophysiologist.

Life and work
Krnjević was born in Zagreb. He attended the University of Edinburgh earning MBChb in 1949, BSc in physiology in 1951 and PhD in 1953 all at the University of Edinburgh.  He continued his post-doctoral studies at the University of Washington, Seattle, 1954–1956, and at the John Curtin School of Medical Research, Australian National University, Canberra, 1956-1958 after which he returned to the UK as Senior Principal Scientist Research Office at Babraham Institute, Cambridge.

After an invitation to be a visiting professor at McGill University, Canada in 1964 he remained there as McGill's Director of Anesthesia Research Department until 1999 and professor of physiology from 1978 to 1987.

He gained worldwide recognition early, clarifying the role of chemical control processes in the brain. Especially important are his discoveries of the nature of chemical neurotransmitters. For research he used techniques and knowledge he acquired during his stay in Canberra. John W. Phillis and Krnjević discovered inhibitory action of gamma-aminobutyric acid and excitatory action of glutamate in the mammalian brain and made important contributions to the clarification of the role which glutamic acid and γ-aminobutyric acid (GABA) have for the signal processing in the brain. He clarified a slow, but prolonged driving action of acetylcholine (ACh) and showed that such a specific effect of ACh is associated with a reduction in permeability of nerve cells for K ions. He found a key role of cellular calcium ions in the regulation of membrane permeability for potassium. Notable is his contribution to the elucidation of the physiological processes in the brain associated with hypoxia.

In 1981, the publication Current Contents called Krnjevic one of the 1,000 most cited contemporary scientists and named three of his papers "citation classics." He was a chief editor of the Canadian Journal of Physiology and Pharmacology, and published over 200 scientific articles and about 100 book chapters.

Awards, memberships and academic posts (selected)
1952-1954 Beit Memorial Fellow
1975 Fellow of the Royal Society of Canada
1978 Alexander Forbes Lecturer
1979 President of the Canadian Physiological Society
1983-1993 Council member of International Union of Physiological Sciences
1984 Gairdner Foundation International Award
1987 Officer of the Order of Canada
1989 Jasper Lecturer Canadian Association for Neuroscience
1992 Corresponding member of the Croatian Academy of Sciences and Arts
1997 Prix Wilder-Penfield
1998 Kershman Lecturer, Eastern EEG Association
2001 Queen Elizabeth II Diamond Jubilee Medal

Selected publications

References

Officers of the Order of Canada
1927 births
2021 deaths
Canadian physiologists
Alumni of the University of Edinburgh
Neurophysiologists
Scientists from Zagreb
Yugoslav emigrants to Canada
Croatian medical researchers
Fellows of the Royal Society of Canada
Yugoslav expatriates in the United Kingdom
Yugoslav expatriates in the United States
Yugoslav expatriates in Australia